Energy in Hungary describes energy and electricity production, consumption and import in Hungary. Energy policy of Hungary describes the politics of Hungary related to energy.

Overview

Nuclear power

Hungary had, in 2017, four operating nuclear power reactors, constructed between 1982 and 1987, at the Paks Nuclear Power Plant.

Oil 
MOL Group is an oil and gas group in Hungary.

Gas 
Emfesz is a natural gas distributor in Hungary. Panrusgáz imports natural gas from Russia mainly Gazprom.

The Arad–Szeged pipeline is a natural gas pipeline from Arad (Romania) to Szeged (Hungary).

Nabucco and South Stream gas pipelines may be constructed via Hungary to other European countries. The Nabucco gas pipeline is expected to pipe 31bn cubic metres of gas annually in a 3,300 km long pipeline constructed via Hungary, Turkey, Romania, Bulgaria and Austria. The South Stream gas pipeline is expected to pipe 63bn cu m of gas from southern Russia to Bulgaria under the Black Sea. The pipe is planned to run via Hungary  to central and southern Europe.

Coal 
The last coal electricity producer, the Matra Power Plant produced around 9% of the electricity needs of Hungary in 2020. It is served by two coal mines in Visonta, and in Bükkábrány. The current generator is to shut down in 2025 to be replaced by a CCGT unit.

Renewable energy

Hungary is a member of the European Union and thus takes part in the EU strategy to increase its share of the renewable energy. The EU has adopted the 2009 Renewable Energy Directive, which included a 20% renewable energy target by 2020 for the EU. By 2030 wind should produce in average 26-35% of the EU's electricity and save Europe €56 billion a year in avoided fuel costs.

The national authors of Hungary forecast is 14.7% renewables in gross energy consumption by 2020, exceeding their 13% binding target by 1.7 percentage points. Hungary is the EU country with the smallest forecast penetration of renewables of the electricity demand in 2020, namely only 11% (including biomass 6% and wind power 3%). The forecast includes 400 MW of new wind power capacity between 2010 and 2020. EWEA's 2009 forecast expects Hungary to reach 1.2 GW of installed wind capacity in this time. In the end of 2010 wind power capacity was 295 MW.

Global warming

In 2007, emissions of carbon dioxide totalled 53.9 million tonnes or around 5.4 tonnes per capita when the EU-27 average was 7.9 tonnes per capita.

See also

References